The ancient Egyptian Egg hieroglyph, Gardiner sign listed no. H8, is a portrayal of an oval-shaped egg, tilted at an angle, within the Gardiner signs for parts of birds.

It is an Egyptian language hieroglyph determinative used for the Egyptian word , "egg". It is also used for the names of goddesses. Goddess Isis uses the egg in her hieroglyphic block. Q1-X1:H8 There are variations of her name block.

Cleopatra III uses the Egg hieroglyph as part of her name within her cartouche.

See also
Gardiner's Sign List#H. Parts of Birds
List of Egyptian hieroglyphs

References

Betrò, 1995. Hieroglyphics: The Writings of Ancient Egypt, Maria Carmela Betrò, c. 1995, 1996-(English), Abbeville Press Publishers, New York, London, Paris (hardcover)

Egyptian hieroglyphs: parts of birds